Clayton, Goodfellow and Co (sometimes Clayton & Goodfellow) of Blackburn, Lancashire, England, were manufacturers of Stationary engines.

The company was incorporated on 9 September 1897 and remains legally extant, with company number 00054026.

References 

 Holmes Mill - Beer Hall, Food Hall Restaurant & Hotel in Clitheroe, Lancashire
 Clayton, Goodfellow and Co - Graces Guide
 Blackburn Standard, Saturday 15 March 1879
 ‘Stationary Steam Engines of Great Britain, Volume 3.1: Lancashire’ by George Watkins: Landmark Publishing Ltd.

Companies based in Blackburn
History of Blackburn with Darwen
Steam engine manufacturers